Spring Hill is a mountain in Barnstable County, Massachusetts. Telegraph Hill is located southwest and Elephantback Hill is located west of Spring Hill.

References

Mountains of Massachusetts
Mountains of Barnstable County, Massachusetts